Culicoides kalix is a species of midges found in Scandinavia. It can be differentiated from its cogenerated by wing and maxillary palp characteristics.

References

Further reading
Lassen, S. B., et al. "Molecular differentiation of Culicoides biting midges (Diptera: Ceratopogonidae) from the subgenus Culicoides Latreille in Denmark." Parasitology research 110.5 (2012): 1765-1771.

kalix
Nematoceran flies of Europe
Diptera of Scandinavia
Insects described in 2015